This is a list of Arabic letter components used in Arabic script.

Table of Letter Components 

A = The letter is used for most languages and dialects with writing systems based on Arabic.

MSA = Letters used in Modern Standard Arabic.

CA = Letters used in Classical Arabic.

AD = Letters used in some regional Arabic Dialects.

"Arabic" = Letters used in Classical Arabic, Modern Standard Arabic, and most regional dialects.

"Farsi" = Letters used in modern Persian.

FW = Foreign words: the letter is sometimes used to spell foreign words.

SV = Stylistic variant: the letter is used interchangeably with at least one other letter depending on the calligraphic style.

AW = Arabic words: the letter is used in additional languages to spell Arabic words.

Table

No additions

dots

1 dot

2 dots

3 dots

4 dots

different dots above and below 

  U+0753, ݓ ARABIC LETTER BEH WITH THREE DOTS POINTING UPWARDS BELOW AND TWO DOTS ABOVE. Hausa https://en.wiktionary.org/wiki/%DD%93
  U+0751, ݑ ARABIC LETTER BEH WITH DOT BELOW AND THREE DOTS ABOVE. Wolof https://en.wiktionary.org/wiki/%DD%91

tōē

ring

line

numeral 

  Burushaski   
  Burushaski   
  Burushaski   
  Burushaski   
  Burushaski   
  Burushaski   
  Burushaski

arrows

Hamza

other semi-optional vowels

blank line for new entries

header

Footnotes 

 The i'jam diacritic characters are illustrative only, in most typesetting the combined characters in the middle of the table are used. The characters used to illustrate the consonant diacritics are from Unicode set "Arabic pedagogical symbols".  The "Arabic Tatweel Modifier Letter" U+0640 character used to show the positional forms doesn't work in some Nastaliq fonts.

 For most letters the isolated form is shown, for select letters all forms (isolated, start, middle, and end) are shown. 

 Urdu Choti Yē has 2 dots below in the initial and middle positions only. The standard Arabic version  always has 2 dots below.

 These characters are used by most languages that use writing systems based on Arabic, though sometimes only in foreign words.

 A Wasala diacritic Unicode character has been proposed but not yet released.

References

External links
Unicode collation charts—including Arabic letters, sorted by shape
 Why the right side of your brain doesn't like Arabic
 Arabic fonts by SIL's Non-Roman Script Initiative
  Alexis Neme and Sébastien Paumier (2019), "Restoring Arabic vowels through omission-tolerant dictionary lookup", Lang Resources & Evaluation, Vol. 53, pp. 1–65. ; 

 
Arabic orthography
Right-to-left writing systems